Michael Spillane may refer to:
Mike Quackenbush (born 1976), real name Michael Spillane, American wrestler
Mickey Spillane (mobster) (1933–1977), Irish-American mobster
Michael Spillane (footballer) (born 1989), Irish footballer